The Embassy of the Netherlands in Ankara is the Netherlands' diplomatic mission to Turkey. It is located at the Netherlands Street 5, Ankara.

The current Dutch Ambassador to Turkey is Marjanne De Kwaasteniet.

See also
Diplomatic missions of the Netherlands
Foreign relations of the Netherlands
Netherlands–Turkey relations

External links 
 Dutch Embassy in Ankara

Ankara
Netherlands
Netherlands–Turkey relations